Aquamicrobium terrae is a Gram-negative, aerobic and non-motile bacteria from the genus of Aquamicrobium which has been isolated from soil which was contaminated with aromatic compounds in Nanjing in China.

References

External links 

Type strain of Aquamicrobium terrae at BacDive -  the Bacterial Diversity Metadatabase

Phyllobacteriaceae
Bacteria described in 2014